Vineyard Vines is an American clothing and accessory retailer founded in 1998 in Martha’s Vineyard, Massachusetts, by brothers Shep and Ian Murray. The brand markets high-end ties, hats, belts, shirts, shorts, swimwear, bags for men, women, and children. It has grown to a collection of retail stores and outlets across the United States. The company's main logo is a pink whale.

History
Shep and Ian Murray originally sold neckties on Martha's Vineyard, selling out of a backpack from their boat or Jeep rather than a storefront. Initially, they offered four different styles of ties. After they sold 800 ties on a single weekend in July, Shep and Ian quickly re-ordered more, paid off their accrued debt, and moved into a new office. The Murray brothers claim that the business was founded through a philosophy of "living the good life," which is reflected by their slogan "Every day should feel this good." Vineyard Vines is still owned outright by the two Murray brothers.

Expansion
Since the summer of 1998, the Vineyard Vines company has expanded nationally, particularly along the East Coast. Vineyard Vines has opened numerous company, outlet, and retail stores.  In addition to these traditional channels, Vineyard Vines has expanded its sales to online shoppers. The company manufactures licensed NFL and MLB product, which it sells through its retail channels. Vineyard Vines also manufactures licensed college apparel, which is sold primarily through campus stores. Vineyard Vines was placed on Inc. magazine's list of the 5000 fastest-growing businesses in the U.S. in 2007. Between 2004 and 2007, the relatively new company's revenue tripled.

 In 2015, the company inaugurated a new headquarters in Stamford, Connecticut.
 In 2016, Vineyard Vines sold 476 million dollars. In that same year the company was reportedly valued at one billion dollars by Goldman Sachs.
 In 2019, Target Corporation offered a 300-product limited edition Vineyard Vines collection in stores and online. The campaign drew some criticism from customers, as many items sold out within an hour.
 All Vineyard Vines stores were temporarily closed in March 2020 due to the COVID-19 pandemic.
 While expanding the sales, the production is mostly placed into Non-U.S. locations, such as China and South America.

Stores

The first stores were opened in Northeastern locations associated with the sea such as Martha's Vineyard. The first was in Edgartown, Martha's Vineyard, followed by Greenwich, Connecticut. The company has expanded to more than 100 stores across the U.S. states and the brand is sold by over 600 other retailers.

Reception
Their clothing has been described as preppy.

References

External links
 

1998 establishments in Massachusetts
Clothing retailers of the United States
Clothing brands of the United States
Clothing companies established in 1998
Retail companies established in 1998
Martha's Vineyard
Private equity portfolio companies
Companies based in Stamford, Connecticut
American brands